Andreas Bernhard Gamst (30 August 1923 – 8 January 2015) was a Norwegian politician for the Liberal Party.

He served as a deputy representative to the Norwegian Parliament from Troms during the term 1969–1973.

Gamst died in January 2015 at the age of 91.

References

External links

1923 births
2015 deaths
Deputy members of the Storting
Liberal Party (Norway) politicians